Maryland's Legislative District 22 is one of 47 districts in the state for the Maryland General Assembly. It covers part of Prince George's County.

Demographic characteristics
As of the 2020 United States census, the district had a population of 144,235, of whom 108,328 (75.1%) were of voting age. The racial makeup of the district was 22,273 (15.4%) White, 65,577 (45.5%) African American, 2,014 (1.4%) Native American, 8,615 (6.0%) Asian, 16 (0.0%) Pacific Islander, 32,693 (22.7%) from some other race, and 12,978 (9.0%) from two or more races. Hispanic or Latino of any race were 46,420 (32.2%) of the population.

The district had 75,652 registered voters as of October 17, 2020, of whom 11,434 (15.1%) were registered as unaffiliated, 5,125 (6.8%) were registered as Republicans, 57,189 (75.6%) were registered as Democrats, and 1,544 (2.0%) were registered to other parties.

Political representation
The district is represented for the 2023–2027 legislative term in the State Senate by Alonzo T. Washington (D) and in the House of Delegates by Anne Healey (D), Nicole A. Williams (D) and Ashanti Martinez (D).

References

Prince George's County, Maryland
22
22